Winchester Cathedral is a cathedral in Winchester.

Winchester Cathedral Priory (640-1539)

Music
Winchester Cathedral Choir

Albums
Winchester Cathedral (New Vaudeville Band album) 1966
Winchester Cathedral (Clinic album) 2004
Winchester Cathedral, album by Lawrence Welk 1992

Songs
"Winchester Cathedral (song)" 1966 song composed by Geoff Stephens and performed by The New Vaudeville Band